Sharon is an unincorporated community in Saline County, in the U.S. state of Missouri.

History
A post office called Sharon was established in 1888, and remained in operation until 1903. The community had the Sharon schoolhouse, now defunct.

References

Unincorporated communities in Saline County, Missouri
Unincorporated communities in Missouri